Wheelton Hind  (1860–1920) was an English surgeon and geologist.

Education and career
Wheelton Hind studied medicine at Guy's Hospital Medical School. He qualified MRCS in 1882. He graduated MB BS Lond in 1883. He was a house surgeon and resident obstetric physician at Guy's Hospital. He received his medical research MD in 1884.

Throughout his medical practice his chief recreation was field work in geology. Following Charles Lapworth's pioneering method of studying index fossils, Hind applied the method to the stratigraphy of Carboniferous rocks in Suffolk.

Wheelton Hind published numerous articles in the Transactions of the North Staffordshire Naturalists' Field Club. His monograph On the Lamellibranch and Gasteropod Fauna found in the Millstone Grit of Scotland was a revision of the stratigraphy of Carboniferous Mollusca and won him the honour of the Keith Medal.

In 1914 he rapidly recruited men to form a battery of Garrison Artillery, and led them to the Western Front. The battery fought in some important engagements. He was soon transferred as Temporary Lieutenant-Colonel RAMC and returned to England at the end of WWI.

Family
Wheelton Hind was the third son of Reverend William Marsden Hind, rector of Hornington, Suffolk (near Ixworth), and author of The Flora of Suffolk. Wheelton Hind married Wilhelmina Maria Manfield (b. 1859) in 1884.

Honours and awards
 1888 — Fellow of the Royal College of Surgeons (FRSC)
 1907 — Keith Medal
 1917 — Lyell Medal

Selected publications

References

External links
 
 

1860 births
1920 deaths
English surgeons
Physicians of Guy's Hospital
English geologists
Royal Army Medical Corps officers
Lyell Medal winners